Fox Sagar Lake, also Jeedimetla Cheruvu or Kolla Cheruvu, is a manmade lake and was the largest waterbody in Secunderabad.

History

The lake was built in 1897 and was a major source of drinking water to residents of Secunderabad. The lake was built before the construction of Osman Sagar and Himayat Sagar, were built in the Musi river. This lake was once linked to Hussain Sagar by a tributary of Musi river.

Description
The lake is spread over an area of 2  km2. A stone structure built as pump house is still existing on the lake shore. However, the steel structures have rusted. As per some sources, the lake water was used for irrigation till few decades ago and the lake was also used for fishing.  Today the water is unfit for consumption due to heavy pollution and its surface area has reduced to one third of its original size due to illegal encroachments by real estate developers. Fox Sagar lake is supposed to be the second most polluted lake in Hyderabad. Some efforts have been initiated by government agencies and volunteers to rejuvenate and clean Fox Sagar lake.

References

External links
 A Report by PITTA

Lakes of Hyderabad, India
Reservoirs in Telangana